Athrips zetterstedtiella is a moth of the family Gelechiidae. It is found in Zimbabwe and South Africa.

References

Moths described in 1852
Athrips
Moths of Africa